Cults is an American indie pop band formed in New York City in 2010. The band first came to prominence when they posted a three-song EP, Cults 7", on their Bandcamp page. They are signed to Sony and In the Name Of, a record label that was set up by British singer Lily Allen.

History

Cults formed in 2010 while guitarist Brian Oblivion and singer Madeline Follin, both from San Diego, were students in New York City. Oblivion went to NYU to study documentary cinema, Follin went to The New School. Madeline had previously recorded with punk band Youth Gone Mad on the album, Touching Cloth.  Cults released an EP on Forrest Family Records, Cults 7", with the track "Go Outside" recorded by Paul Kostabi at Thunderdome Studios, named "Best New Music" by Pitchfork Media. They toured supporting the Richie Follin's Band with overlapping members for six months before signing to ITNO/Sony. Their song "Go Outside" had a video made for it which starred Emma Roberts and Dave Franco.  Another video featured the band inter-cut with footage of Jim Jones and Jonestown.

Their self-titled debut album, Cults, was released on June 7, 2011, by Columbia Records imprint In the Name Of run by Lily Allen. The album received generally positive reviews, and a second "Best New Music" from Pitchfork was earned for the track "Abducted".

In 2011 Cults collaborated with the group Superhuman Happiness on a version of the track "Um Canto De Afoxé para o Bloco Do Ilê" for the Red Hot Organisation's most recent charity album Red Hot+Rio 2. The album is a follow-up to the 1996 Red Hot + Rio. Proceeds from sales were donated toward causes raising awareness of AIDS/HIV and related health and social issues. The band was chosen to perform at the ATP I'll Be Your Mirror festival curated by ATP & Portishead in September 2011 in Asbury Park, New Jersey, and also by Battles to perform at the ATP Nightmare Before Christmas festival that they co-curate in December 2011 in Minehead, England.

In early 2012 Cults played the Australasian music festival Laneways. In an interview with 3news they said people could expect a more "aggressive sound" with a lot of changes being made to songs as a five-piece band.

In an interview with the magazine Coup De Main, Madeline Follin was quoted saying that "You Know What I Mean" is her favorite song on their self-titled debut album.

In 2013 they were featured alongside Amber Coffman on J. Cole's Born Sinner album which peaked at number 1 on the Billboard 200. The song later peaked at number 90 on the Billboard Hot 100.

Also in 2013, the band recorded their second album, Static, in the aftermath of the duo's breakup. Reviews were generally favorable.
 
In 2016, Madeline Follin collaborated with her brother Richie James Follin for a side-project called Follin. Their single "Roxy" was released online on February 23 of that year.

On October 6, 2017, the band released their third album, Offering.

In 2019 the song "You Know What I Mean" was featured as the outro to episode 6 of Netflix's Russian Doll.

On September 18, 2020, the band released their fourth album, Host.

On August 17, 2021, the single "Always Forever" was certified gold by the RIAA and later was certified platinum on July 18, 2022.

Band members
 Brian Oblivion – vocals, guitar, keyboards, percussion
 Madeline Follin – vocals

Live members
 Cory Stier - drums
 Max Kamins - bass guitar
 Nathan Aguilar – bass guitar (past)
 Marc Deriso – drums
 Richie Follin  – guitar (past)
 Gabriel Rodriguez – aux, guitar (past)
 Loren Humphrey - drums

Discography

Albums

Extended plays

Singles

As lead artist

As featured artist

Other charted songs and certified songs

Guest appearances

Production and songwriting credits

References

External links

 
 Cults' MySpace Page
 Cults' Bandcamp Page
  Cults la pop, l'amour&les cheveux

Indie rock musical groups from New York (state)
Musical groups established in 2010
Musical groups from New York City
2010 establishments in New York City